Osteophorus is an extinct genus of eryopoidean temnospondyl within the family Eryopidae. It is only known from the Permian of Poland.

See also
 Prehistoric amphibian
 List of prehistoric amphibians

References

Eryopids
Prehistoric amphibian genera
Permian temnospondyls of Europe
Fossil taxa described in 1856
Taxa named by Christian Erich Hermann von Meyer